Irente School for the Blind Girls was founded in 1963 by the Lutheran Church in the Usambara Mountains in Lushoto, Tanzania. It is a small residential/primary school. Subjects include craft training and agriculture.

References

External links 
Irente School for the Blind – Lushoto, Tanzania

Buildings and structures in the Tanga Region
Schools for the blind in Tanzania